The Irish Greyhound of the Year Awards are the annual awards for the leading greyhounds in Ireland. 

The Greyhound of the Year award was first held in 1965 when it was won by Ballyowen Chief. In 1996 the awards saw the Greyhound of the Year replaced by a Dog and Bitch of the Year Award  but in 2013 the Greyhound of the Year award returned in addition to the other awards.

The 2016 awards did not take place until October 2017 following a postponement. Continuing protests by the DGOBA resulted in a suspension of the awards and racing at Shelbourne Park for five months and the cancellation of several major events. The protest was over the February closure of Harold's Cross Stadium.

Past winners

Main Award

Dog of the Year

Bitch of the Year

Sprinter Award

Stayer Award

Brood Bitch

Stud Dog

See also
Greyhound of the Year Awards

References

Greyhound racing competitions in Ireland
Recurring sporting events established in 1965